The Turn of the Screw is an 1898 horror novella by Henry James which first appeared in serial format in Collier's Weekly (January 27 – April 16, 1898). In October 1898, it was collected in The Two Magics, published by Macmillan in New York City and Heinemann in London. The novella follows a governess who, caring for two children at a remote estate, becomes convinced that the grounds are haunted. The Turn of the Screw is considered a work of both Gothic and horror fiction.

In the century following its publication, critical analysis of the novella has undergone several major transformations. Initial reviews regarded it only as a frightening ghost story, but, in the 1930s, some critics suggested that the supernatural elements were figments of the governess' imagination. In the early 1970s, the influence of structuralism resulted in an acknowledgement that the text's ambiguity was its key feature. Later approaches incorporated Marxist and feminist thinking.

The novella has been adapted numerous times, including a Broadway play (1950), a chamber opera (1954), two films (in 1961 and 2020), and a miniseries (2020).

Plot 
On Christmas Eve, an unnamed narrator and some of their friends are gathered around a fire. One of them, Douglas, reads a manuscript written by his sister's late governess. The manuscript tells the story of her being hired by a man who has become responsible for his young niece and nephew following the deaths of their parents. He lives mainly in London and has a country house in Bly, Essex. The boy, Miles, is attending a boarding school, while his younger sister, Flora, is living in Bly, where she is cared for by Mrs. Grose, the housekeeper. Flora's uncle, the governess's new employer, is uninterested in raising the children and gives her full charge, explicitly stating that she is not to bother him with communications of any sort.  The governess travels to Bly and begins her duties.

Miles returns from school for the summer just after a letter arrives from the headmaster, stating that he has been expelled. Miles never speaks of the matter, and the governess is hesitant to raise the issue. She fears there is some horrible secret behind the expulsion, but is too charmed by the boy to want to press the issue. Soon after, around the grounds of the estate, the governess begins to see the figures of a man and woman whom she does not recognize. The figures come and go at will without being seen or challenged by other members of the household, and they seem to the governess to be supernatural. She learns from Mrs. Grose that the governess's predecessor, Miss Jessel, and another employee, Peter Quint, had had a close relationship. Before their deaths, Jessel and Quint spent much of their time with Flora and Miles, and the governess becomes convinced that the two children are aware of the ghosts' presence and influenced by them.

Without permission, Flora leaves the house while Miles is playing music for the governess. The governess notices Flora's absence and goes with Mrs. Grose in search of her. They find her on the shore of a nearby lake, and the governess is convinced that Flora has been talking to the ghost of Miss Jessel. The governess sees Miss Jessel and believes Flora sees her as well, but Mrs. Grose does not. Flora denies seeing Miss Jessel and begins to insist that she will not see the new governess again. The governess decides that Mrs. Grose should take Flora away to her uncle in attempt to escape Miss Jessel's influence. The governess is left with Miles, who that night at last talks to her about his expulsion, revealing that it was because he said things he states he cannot remember to people he also cannot remember. The ghost of Quint appears to the governess at the window. The governess shields Miles, who attempts to see the ghost. The governess insists to Miles he is no longer controlled by the ghost, and then finds that Miles has died in her arms.

Genre

Gothic fiction 
As a piece of Gothic fiction, critics highlight the influence of Charlotte Brontë's Jane Eyre (1847) on the novella. The Turn of the Screw borrows both from Jane Eyre's themes of class and gender, and from its mid-nineteenth century setting. The novella alludes to Jane Eyre in tandem with an explicit reference to Ann Radcliffe's Gothic novel The Mysteries of Udolpho (1794), wherein the governess wonders if there might be a secret relative hidden in the attic at Bly. One critic writes that the only "definite event" in the novel that does not "belong" in Gothic fantasy is Miles' expulsion from school.

Although the influence of the Gothic on the novella is clear, it cannot only be characterised as one. James' ghosts differ from those of traditional Gothic tales – frightening, often bound in chains – by appearing like their living selves. Similarly, the novella foregoes major devices associated with Gothic novels, such as digressions, as in Frankenstein (1818) and Dracula (1897), instead relating one whole, continuous narrative.

Ghost story and horror fiction 
For the story's publication in Collier's Weekly, James was contracted to write a ghost story. As a result, some critics have regarded it in that tradition. L. Andrew Cooper observed that The Turn of the Screw might be the best-known example of a ghost story which exploits the ambiguity of a first-person narrative. Citing James' reference to the work as his "designed horror", Donald P. Costello suggested that the effect of a given scene varies depending on who represents the action. In scenes where the governess directly reports on what she sees, the effect is horror, but in those where she merely comments, the effect is "mystification". In his 1983 nonfiction survey of the horror genre, author Stephen King described The Turn of the Screw and The Haunting of Hill House (1959) as the only two great supernatural works of horror in a century. He argued that both contain "secrets best left untold and things left best unsaid", calling that the basis of the horror genre. Gillian Flynn called the novella one of the most chilling ghost stories ever written.

Several biographers have indicated that James was familiar with spiritualism, and at the very least regarded it as entertainment. His brother William was an active researcher of supernatural phenomena. Scientific inquiry at the time was curious about the existence of ghosts, and James' description of Peter Quint and Miss Jessel—dressed in black with severe expressions—resemble the ghosts found in scientific literature rather than those of fictional narratives. The character of Douglas describes himself as a student of Trinity College, where James knew research into the supernatural occurred. It is unknown whether James believed in ghosts.

Background

Biographical context and composition 
By the 1890s, James' readership had dwindled since the success of Daisy Miller (1878), and he had encountered financial troubles. His health had also worsened, with advancing gout, and several of his close friends had died: his sister and diarist Alice James, and writers Robert Louis Stevenson, and Constance Fenimore Woolson. In a letter from October 1895, James wrote: "I see ghosts everywhere". In an entry in his journal from January 12, 1895, James recounts a ghost story told to him by Edward White Benson, the archbishop of Canterbury, while visiting him for tea at his home two days earlier. The story bears a striking resemblance to what would eventually become The Turn of the Screw, with depraved servants corrupting young children before and after their deaths.

Towards the end of 1897, James was contracted to write a twelve-part ghost story for Collier's Weekly, an illustrated magazine. Having just signed a twenty-one year lease on a house in Rye, East Sussex, James —thankful for the additional income—accepted the offer. Collier's Weekly paid James US$900 for the serial rights. A year earlier, in 1897, The Chap-Book paid him US$150 for serial and book rights to What Maisie Knew.

James found it difficult to write by hand, reserving that for his journals. The Turn of the Screw was dictated to his secretary, William MacAlpine, who took shorthand notes and returned with typed notes the following day. Finding such a delay frustrating, James purchased his own Remington typewriter and dictated directly to MacAlphine. In December 1897, James wrote to his sister-in-law: "I have, at last, finished my little book."

Publication and later revisions 
The Turn of the Screw was first published in the magazine Collier's Weekly, serialised in 12 installments (27 January – 16 April 1898). The title illustration by John La Farge depicts the governess with her arm around Miles. Episode illustrations were by Eric Pape.

In October 1898, the novella appeared with the short story "Covering End" in a volume titled The Two Magics, published by Macmillan in New York City and by Heinemann in London.

Ten years after publication, James revised The Turn of the Screw for the New York Edition of the text. James made many changes, but most were minor, such as changing "utter" to "express"; the narrative was unchanged. The New York Editions most important contribution was the retrospective account of the influences and writing of the novella James gave in his preface. James indicated, for example, that he was aware of research into the supernatural. In his preface, James only briefly mentions the story's origin in a magazine. In 2016, Kirsten MacLeod, citing James' private correspondence, indicated that he had a strong dislike for the serial form.

Reception

Early criticism 
Early reviews emphasised the novella's power to frighten, and most saw the tale as a brilliant, if simple, ghost story. According to scholar Terry Heller, most early reviewers saw the novel as a formidable piece of Gothic fiction.

An early review of The Turn of the Screw was in The New York Times Saturday Review of Books and Art, stating it was worthy of being compared to Robert Louis Stevenson's Strange Case of Dr Jekyll and Mr Hyde (1886). The reviewer noted it as a successful study of evil, referring to the ghosts' influence over the children and the governess. Scholar Terry Heller notes that the children featured prominently in early criticism because the novella violated a Victorian presumption of childhood innocence.

Conceptions of the text wherein the ghosts are real entities are often referred to as the "apparitionist interpretation"; consequently, a "non-apparitionist" holds the opposite perspective. In a 1918 essay, Virginia Woolf wrote that Miss Jessel and Peter Quint possessed "neither the substance nor independent existence of ghosts". Woolf did not suggest that the ghosts were hallucinations, but—in a similar fashion to other early critics—said they represented the governess' growing awareness of evil in the world. The power of the story, she argued, was in forcing readers to realise the dark places fiction could take their minds.

Psychoanalytic interpretations 
In 1934, literary critic Edmund Wilson posited that the ghosts were hallucinations of the governess, who he suggested was sexually repressed. As evidence, Wilson points to her background as the daughter of a country parson, and suggests that she is infatuated with her employer. Before Wilson's article, another critic—Edna Kenton—had written to similar effect, but Wilson's fame as a literary critic shifted the discourse around the novella completely. Wilson drew heavily from Kenton's writing, but applied explicitly Freudian terminology. For example, he pointed to Quint first being sighted by the governess on a phallic tower. A book-length close reading of the text was produced in 1965 using Wilson's Freudian analysis as a foundation; it characterised the governess as increasingly mad and hysterical. Leon Edel, James' most influential biographer, wrote that it is not the ghosts who haunt the children, but the governess.

While many supported Wilson's theory, it was by no means authoritative. Robert B. Heilman was a prominent advocate for the apparitionist interpretation; he saw the story as a Hawthornesque allegory about good and evil, and the ghosts as active agents to that effect. Scholars critical of Wilson's essay pointed to Douglas' positive account of the governess's character in the prologue, long after her death. Most crucially, they indicated that the governess's description of the ghost enabled Mrs Grose to identify him as Peter Quint before the governess knew he existed. The second point led Wilson to "retract his thesis (temporarily)"; in a later revision of his essay, he argued the governess had been made aware of another male at Bly by Mrs Grose.

Structuralism 
In the 1970s, critics began to apply structuralist Tzvetan Todorov's notion of the fantastic to The Turn of the Screw. Todorov emphasised the importance of "hesitation" in stories with supernatural elements, and critics found an abundance of them within James' novella. For example, the reader's sympathy may hesitate between the children or the governess, and the text hesitates between supporting the ghosts' existence, and rejecting them. Christine Brooke-Rose argued in a three-part essay that the ambiguity so frequently argued over was a foundational part of the text that had been ignored. From the 1980s onward, critics increasingly refused to ask questions about diegetic elements of the text, instead acknowledging that many elements simply cannot be known definitively.

Ambiguity
This scholarly debate surrounding the "correct reading" of The Turn of the Screw is addressed by Shlomith Rimmon-Kenan. In her work, The Concept of Ambiguity, the examples of James (1977), she gives an insightful guide to the role of ambiguity within narratives in literature. The examples listed by her are applied to different works by James, including The Turn of the Screw. By examining the work of Rimmon-Kenan, it becomes apparent that James had no intention of revealing a "correct reading" of this novella. This is made clear by his use of narration within the novella itself. James, by selecting an objective narrator, Douglas, at the beginning of the novella, places a considerable distance and time between the events at Bly Manor and the reader. It also introduces the first example of ambiguity within the novella. As Douglas admits, the story he is retelling is about his sister's Governess. The events are described within the Governess's manuscript that Douglas is now in possession of. The manuscript itself though creates a further sense of ambiguity. The Governess has passed and is therefore incapable of explaining or providing any clarity to her manuscript. The absence of the Governess at the beginning of the novella further complicates the story. The validity of the happenings at Bly Manor is further questioned by the lack of a strong first-person narrator. James emphasises that the events, which are themselves, based on the manuscript of the Governess, are being recalled by Douglas. The true narrator and witness to the alleged haunting of Bly Manor are not known to the reader, but only through the memories of Douglas and the manuscript. This sense of distance introduced by James is another deliberate attempt to create a sense of ambiguity about the legitimacy of the story.

The creation of ambiguity within this novella is not reliant solely on the narrative style. The use of dialogue within the novella itself, confirms that many of the characters are not entirely transparent in the Governess's search for answers. This is very much the case in the interactions between Mrs. Grose and the Governess. Mrs. Grose appears to be stuck in a cycle of confirmation and denial within the novella. Rimmon-Kenan summarizes the attitude of Mrs. Grose to be one of "disapproval, but from time to time she confirms the governess's views."   It is not entirely clear whether or not Mrs. Grose believes the events of Bly Manor herself, but she is aware of the implications being made. However, Mrs. Grose does not directly address the previous occurrences at Bly Manor. This is made clear in a specific interaction between Mrs. Grose and the Governess, in which Mrs. Grose reveals Flora has spoken to her in confidence. Once more, Mrs. Grose is vague in her conversation with the Governess; "[f]rom that child—horrors!" and adds, "[o]n my honour, Miss she says things—!". This use of dialogue by James continues to leave his readers in suspense and without answers. The use of the term "things" is ominous and vague. It suggests that Flora may have confirmed the existence of the ghosts. It may also confirm that Mrs. Grose is in shock at the lies Flora has told her. 

The focus of Rimmon-Kenan's work shifts away from whether the ghosts were real and onto how James generated and then sustained the text's ambiguity. A study into revisions James made to two paragraphs in the novella concluded that James was not striving for clarity, but to create a text which could not be interpreted definitively in either direction.

Marxist and feminist approaches 
After the debate over the reality of the ghosts quietened in literary criticism, critics began to apply other theoretical frameworks to The Turn of the Screw. Marxist critics argued that the emphasis placed by academics on James' language distracted from class-based explorations of the text. The children's uncle, who featured largely only in the psychoanalytic interpretations as an obsession of the governess, was regarded by some as symbolising a selfish upper-class. Heath Moon notes how he abandoned his orphaned niece, nephew, and their ancestral home to instead live in London as a bachelor. Mrs Grose's distaste for the relationship between Quint and Miss Jessel was noted to be part of a Victorian dislike for relationships that were between different social classes. The death of Miles and Flora's parents in India became a fixture of postcolonial explorations of the text, given the status of India as a British colony during James' lifetime.

Explorations of the governess have become a mainstay of feminist writing on the text. Priscilla Walton noted that James' account of the story's origin disparaged the ability of women to tell stories, and framed The Turn of the Screw as James thus telling it on their behalf. Others see James in a more positive light. Paula Marantz Cohen positively compares James' treatment of the governess to Sigmund Freud's writing about a young woman named Dora. Cohen likens the way that Freud transforms Dora into merely a summary of her symptoms to how critics such as Edmund Wilson reduced the governess to a case of neurotic sexual repression.

Adaptations 

The Turn of the Screw has been the subject of a range of adaptations and reworkings in a variety of media. Many of these have, themselves, been analysed in the academic literature on Henry James and neo-Victorian culture.

Stage
The novella was adapted to an opera by Benjamin Britten, which premiered in 1954, and the opera has been filmed on multiple occasions. The novella was adapted as a ballet score (1980) by Luigi Zaninelli, and separately as a ballet (1999) by Will Tucket for the Royal Ballet. Harold Pinter directed The Innocents (1950), a Broadway play which was an adaptation of The Turn of the Screw. An adaptation by Jeffrey Hatcher, using the title The Turn of the Screw, premiered in Portland, Maine, in 1996 and was produced off-Broadway in 1999. Another adaptation of the same title by Rebecca Lenkiewicz was presented in a co-production with Hammer at the Almeida Theatre, London, in January 2013.

Films
There have been numerous film adaptations of the novel. The critically acclaimed The Innocents (1961), directed by Jack Clayton, and Michael Winner's prequel The Nightcomers (1972) are two notable examples. Other feature film adaptations include Rusty Lemorande's 1992 eponymous adaptation (set in the 1960s); 's Spanish language  (The Turn of the Screw, 1985); Presence of Mind (1999), directed by Atoni Aloy; and In a Dark Place (2006), directed by Donato Rotunno. The Others (2001) is not an adaptation but has some themes in common with James's novella. In 2018, director Floria Sigismondi filmed an adaptation of the novella, titled The Turning, on the Kilruddery Estate in Ireland.

Television films have included a 1959 American adaptation as part of Ford Startime directed by John Frankenheimer and starring Ingrid Bergman; the West German Die sündigen Engel (The Sinful Angel, 1962), a 1974 adaptation directed by Dan Curtis, adapted by William F. Nolan; a French adaptation entitled Le Tour d'écrou (The Turn of the Screw, 1974); a Mexican miniseries entitled Otra vuelta de tuerca (The Turn of the Screw, 1981); a 1982 adaptation directed by Petr Weigl primarily starring Czech actors lip-synching; a 1990 adaptation directed by Graeme Clifford; The Haunting of Helen Walker (1995), directed by Tom McLoughlin; a 1999 adaptation directed by Ben Bolt; a low-budget 2003 version written and directed by Nick Millard; the Italian-language Il mistero del lago (The Mystery of the Lake, 2009); and a 2009 BBC film adapted by Sandy Welch, starring Michelle Dockery, Dan Stevens and Sue Johnston. A Brazilian movie named Através da Sombra (Through the Shadow, 2015) was released, heavily influenced by the book, only changing the characters' names and location to make it feel like it is set in Brazil. In 2020 it was adapted into a movie called The Turning.

Literature
Literary references to and influences by The Turn of the Screw identified by the James scholar Adeline R. Tintner include The Secret Garden (1911), by Frances Hodgson Burnett; "Poor Girl" (1951), by Elizabeth Taylor; The Peacock Spring (1975), by Rumer Godden; Ghost Story (1975) by Peter Straub; "The Accursed Inhabitants of House Bly" (1994) by Joyce Carol Oates; and Miles and Flora (1997)—a sequel—by Hilary Bailey. Further literary adaptations identified by other authors include Affinity (1999), by Sarah Waters; A Jealous Ghost (2005), by A. N. Wilson; and Florence & Giles (2010), by John Harding. Young adult novels inspired by The Turn of the Screw include The Turning (2012) by Francine Prose and Tighter (2011) by Adele Griffin. Ruth Ware's 2019 novel The Turn of the Key sets the story in the 21st century.

Television
The Turn of the Screw has also influenced television. In December 1968, the ABC daytime drama Dark Shadows featured a storyline based on The Turn of the Screw. In the story, the ghosts of Quentin Collins and Beth Chavez haunted the west wing of Collinwood, possessing the two children living in the mansion. The story led to a year-long story in the year 1897, as Barnabas Collins travelled back in time to prevent Quentin's death and stop the possession. In early episodes of Star Trek: Voyager ("Cathexis", "Learning Curve" and "Persistence of Vision"), Captain Kathryn Janeway is seen on the holodeck acting out scenes from the holonovel Janeway Lambda one, which appears to be based on The Turn of the Screw. In 2020, Netflix adapted the novella as The Haunting of Bly Manor for the second season of Mike Flanagan's The Haunting anthology series.

Explanatory notes

References

External links 

 
 The Turn of the Screw at Project Gutenberg (1898 book version)
 
 Author's preface to the New York Edition text of The Turn of the Screw (1908) 
 

1898 American novels
1898 British novels
Frame stories
British novellas
American horror novels
American gothic novels
Ghost novels
Novels adapted into operas
American novels adapted into television shows
British novels adapted into television shows
American novellas
American novels adapted into films
Fiction with unreliable narrators
1898 fantasy novels
Novels set in Essex
American novels adapted into plays
Works originally published in Collier's
Novels by Henry James
British novels adapted into films
British novels adapted into plays
Novels adapted into ballets
Novels first published in serial form
British horror novels
British Gothic novels
Works set in country houses